Collin is a French-language surname.

Geographical distribution
As of 2014, 47.6% of all known bearers of the surname Collin were residents of France (frequency 1:2,853), 10.7% of Belgium (1:2,197), 10.2% of Canada (1:7,383), 6.7% of the United States (1:110,104), 4.3% of England (1:26,326), 3.0% of Sweden (1:6,653), 2.9% of South Africa (1:37,430), 1.6% of Germany (1:101,299), 1.1% of Malaysia (1:55,995), 1.0% of Australia (1:49,632) and 1.0% of Papua New Guinea (1:17,312).

In Belgium, the frequency of the surname was higher than national average (1:2,197) only in one region: Wallonia (1:892).

In France, the frequency of the surname was higher than national average (1:2,853) in the following regions:
 1. Grand Est (1:1,055)
 2. Brittany (1:1,360)
 3. Bourgogne-Franche-Comté (1:1,705)
 4. Centre-Val de Loire (1:2,101)
 5. Île-de-France (1:2,846)

In Sweden, the frequency of the surname was higher than national average (1:6,653) in the following counties:
 1. Örebro County (1:3,100)
 2. Södermanland County (1:4,363)
 3. Gävleborg County (1:4,376)
 4. Kronoberg County (1:4,784)
 5. Västmanland County (1:5,086)
 6. Stockholm County (1:5,419)
 7. Dalarna County (1:5,954)
 8. Östergötland County (1:5,994)

People
Abel Collin (1653–1705), benefactor in Nottingham, England
Adam Collin (born 1984), English footballer
Albéric Collin (1886–1962), Belgian sculptor
Anton Collin (1891–1973), Finnish cross country skier
Aurélien Collin (born 1986), French footballer
Birgit Collin-Langen (born 1956), German politician
Charles Jean Baptiste Collin-Mezin (1841–1923), French maker of violins, violas, cellos, basses, bows
Christen Collin (1857–1926), Norwegian literary historian
Dieter Collin (1893–1918), German flying ace in World War I
Édouard Collin (born 1987), French actor
Elsa Collin (1887–1941), Swedish theatre critic, poet and actress
Fernand Collin (1897–1990), Belgian businessman
Francis Collin (born 1987), English professional footballer
Frank Collin (born 1944) formerly served as the leader of the National Socialist Party of America
Frederick Collin (1850–1939), New York judge
Frédérique Collin (born 1944), Canadian actress, screenwriter and film director
George Collin (1905–1989), English footballer
George H. Collin (1856–1938), American politician in the state of Washington
Gustav Collin (1890–1966), Swedish swimmer
Hannah Collin (born 1982), English former professional tennis player
Heinrich Joseph von Collin (1771–1811), Austrian dramatist
Hialmar Collin (1891–1987), Danish diplomat
Hyacinthe Collin de Vermont (1693–1761), French painter
Jacques Collin de Plancy (1793–1881), French occultist, demonologist and writer
James Edward Collin (1876–1968), English entomologist
Jean Christophe Collin (1754–1806), French general of cavalry
John Collin (disambiguation)
Joseph Henry Collin (1893–1918), English soldier, recipient of the Victoria Cross
Kasper Collin (born 1972), Swedish film director, filmmaker, screenwriter, film producer
Keith Collin (1937–1991), British diver
Luc Collin, pen name Batem (born 1960), Belgian comics artist
Marc Collin, French musician, film music composer and record producer
Marcus Collin (1882–1966), artist from Finland
Mary Collin (1860–1955), English teacher and campaigner for women's suffrage
Matthäus Casimir von Collin (1779–1824), Austrian poet
Maxime Collin (born 1979), Canadian actor and business owner
Paul Collin (1843–1915), French poet, writer, translator and librettist
Philipp Collin (born 1990), German male former volleyball player
Raphaël Collin (1850–1916), French painter and teacher
Richard Collin (1626–1698), engraver from Luxembourg
Richard H. Collin (1932–2010), American historian and food writer
Robbie Collin, British film critic
Robert E. Collin (1928–2010), Canadian American electrical engineer and professor
Rodney Collin (1909–1956), British writer in the area of spiritual development
Tom Collin (1911–2003), English cricketer
Victor Collin de Plancy (1853–1924), French diplomat, bibliophile, and art collector
Xavier Collin (born 1974), French former professional footballer
Yvon Collin (born 1944), member of the Senate of France

See also
 Collin (disambiguation)
 Colin (surname)
 Collins (surname)

References

French-language surnames
Surnames from given names